
Year 856 (DCCCLVI) was a leap year starting on Wednesday (link will display the full calendar) of the Julian calendar.

Events 
 By place 
 Byzantine Empire 
 March 15 – Emperor Michael III overthrows the regency of his mother Theodora. He appoints his uncle Bardas as the de facto regent and co-ruler of the Byzantine Empire.

 Europe 
 King Charles the Bald cedes the county of Maine to Erispoe, ruler (duke) of Brittany—this in return for an alliance against the Vikings.  
 King Ordoño I of Asturias is said to have begun the repopulation of the town of León in the northwest of Spain (approximate date).

 Britain 
 October 1 – King Æthelwulf of Wessex marries the 12- or 13-year-old Judith, daughter of Charles the Bald, at Verberie (Northern France). She is crowned queen and anointed by Hincmar, archbishop of Reims. The marriage is a diplomatic alliance between Wessex and the West Frankish Kingdom.
 Winter – Æthelwulf returns to Wessex to face a revolt by his eldest son Æthelbald, who usurps the throne. Æthelwulf agrees to give up the western part of his kingdom, in order to avoid a civil war. He keeps control over Sussex, Surrey, Essex and Kent, over which Prince Æthelberht has presided.

 By topic 
 Geology 
 November (approximate date) – An earthquake in Corinth, Greece kills an estimated 45,000 people.
 December 3 – Another earthquake strikes the Abbasid Caliphate (modern-day Tunisia), also killing an estimated 45,000 people.
 December 22 – Another earthquake strikes Damghan (modern-day Iran), killing an estimated 200,000 people.

Births 
 October 24 – Li Keyong, Shatuo governor (jiedushi) (d. 908)
 Li Maozhen, Chinese warlord and king (d. 924)

Deaths 
 January 7 – Aldric, bishop of Le Mans
 February 4 – Rabanus Maurus, archbishop of Mainz
 August 6 – Fujiwara no Nagara, Japanese statesman (b. 802)
 August 16 – Theutbald I, bishop of Langres
 Florinus of Remüs, Frankish priest and martyr 
 Godfrid Haraldsson, Viking chieftain (approximate date)
 Guerin, Frankish nobleman (or 845)
 Ilyas ibn Asad, Muslim emir (approximate date)
 Muhammad I Abu 'l-Abbas, Muslim emir

References

Sources